The 1900–01 season was Burslem Port Vale's third consecutive season (seventh overall) of football in the English Football League. Finishing in ninth place for the second time in three years, the club would have to wait over two decades before they would better such a finish. Vale was a typical mid-table team in 1900–01, with their home form being slightly disappointing compared to teams around them in the table. The team was settled, however, once again poor attendances were an issue.

Overview

Second Division
The pre-season saw the return of Stoke legend Tommy Clare, now aged 35; and inside-left James Peake, following a season with Millwall Athletic. Otherwise local lads filled the void left by the stars that were sold off in the previous season.

True to expectations, the "Valeites" suffered at the start of the season, recording three heavy defeats in their first seven games. However, things picked up when striker Adrian Capes arrived from Burton Swifts in November 1900. By March, the side broke into the top six, though were eleven points short of the two promotion places. The season ended with three wins from four games, and the Vale finished six points from the re-election zones, but fifteen points from promotion.

New boy Capes finished as top scorer, with Peake, Eardley, and Price contributing seven goals each. Goalkeeper Alfred Maybury made his debut on 8 September, and never missed a match after that, though was still released at the season's end (later joining Chesterfield). Eight other players managed at least 30 appearances (out of a possible 37), with George Price an ever-present. The defence was described as "consistent and sturdy", and Peake, Eardley, and Capes were praised for the turnaround in results. The policy of local youth continued, having been successful throughout the campaign. James Peake and Alfred Maybury departed, and full-back Frank Stokes was sold to Reading; but otherwise the original team was retained.

Finances
Financially the club lost £73, to add to their £1,000 debt. Taking note from the previous campaign, the playing budget was reduced by over £750, though gate receipts dropped a further £235. Poor weather was blamed for the miserable support.

Cup competitions
In the FA Cup, a 3–1 home defeat was recorded to Second Division rivals New Brighton Tower in the opening round. The result was the same as their league encounter, down to an Adrian Capes consolation. Vale also exited both county cups at the first hurdle.

League table

Results

Burslem Port Vale's score comes first

Football League Second Division

Results by matchday

Matches

FA Cup

Birmingham Senior Cup

Staffordshire Senior Cup

Player statistics

Appearances

Top scorers

Transfers

Transfers in

Transfers out

References
Specific

General

Port Vale F.C. seasons
Burslem Port Vale